Stenocnemus is a genus of ground beetles in the family Carabidae. This genus has a single species, Stenocnemus mannerheimii. It is found in Hispaniola.

References

Platyninae